Lars Thomas Idergard (born 1 March 1969 in Arvidsjaur) was a Swedish businessman and political commentator connected with the Moderate Party. Now he is a Jesuit and a Catholic Priest.

He gained prominence as chairman of the Moderate Youth League between 1995 and 1998. He was seen as a future leader of the party but after his resignation he withdrew from party politics. He was thus considered as part of the "Lost Generation" of the Moderate Party together with Ulf Kristersson.

In 2003, he was one of the leaders of Sweden in Europe, campaigning for Swedish membership of the euro.

He was often seen on Swedish TV as a commentator and wrote a column in Svenska Dagbladet

In 2009, he became a Roman Catholic and in 2014, a brother in the Society of Jesus. In 2017, he was ordained deacon in the Catholic Church. He was ordained priest in the Catholic Church on September 30, 2017, by the Catholic bishop of Sweden, Anders Cardinal Arborelius OCD, in the Jesuit St. Eugenia Church in Stockholm, where he also has his work (http://www.dagen.se/nyheter/tidigare-moderaten-thomas-idergard-prastvigd-1.1033757 samt https://www.dn.se/nyheter/sverige/bytte-politiken-mot-kyrkan-blir-nu-prast/).

References 

1969 births
Living people
Moderate Party politicians
21st-century Jesuits
Swedish Jesuits
Converts to Roman Catholicism
People from Arvidsjaur Municipality
21st-century Swedish businesspeople